Chaetoderma elegans is a species of glisten worm, a kind of shell-less, worm-like mollusc in the family Chaetodermatidae. This species is found in the Eastern Pacific Ocean.

References

 Turgeon, D.D., J.F.Jr. Quinn, A.E. Bogan, E.V. Coan, F.G. Hochberg, W.G. Lyons, P.M. Mikkelsen, R.J. Neves, C.F.E. Roper, G. Rosenberg, B. Roth, A. Scheltema, F.G. Thompson, M. Vecchione and J.D. Willams 1998 Common and scientific names of aquatic invertebrates from the United States and Canada: Mollusks, 2nd ed. American Fisheries Society (Special publication 26), Bethesda, Maryland. 526 p.

External links

Aplacophorans
Molluscs described in 1997